Shewanella baltica DSS12 (S. violacea) is a gram-negative bacterium. Its type strain is NCTC 10735. It is of particular importance in fish spoilage.

References

Further reading

External links

Type strain of Shewanella baltica at BacDive -  the Bacterial Diversity Metadatabase

Alteromonadales
Bacteria described in 1998